Piece by Piece Remixed is the first remix album by American singer Kelly Clarkson, released by RCA Records on March 4, 2016. It contains various remixes and re-recordings of selections from her seventh studio album Piece by Piece (2015), including two Billboard Dance Club Songs hit singles ("Heartbeat Song" and "Invincible"), the "Idol version" of the title track, "Piece by Piece", and a live recording of "Tightrope" at the Piece by Piece Tour. Released exclusively in digital download and music streaming platforms, it became her first entry on the Billboard Dance/Electronic Albums chart at number one with digital sales of 2,000 copies.

Background and release 
In a 2015 interview with Time, Clarkson revealed that she had commissioned club remixes of the tracks from her seventh studio album Piece by Piece (2015) as part of their discussion of foraying into different genres—including a possible dance music album. Some of these tracks include "Heartbeat Song", "Take You High", and "Dance with Me", with the intention of releasing them to music clubs in the future. Following a successful response of her rendition of the title track, "Piece by Piece", on the final season of the television competition series American Idol on February 25, 2016, Clarkson immediately recorded a studio version of her performance and sub-named it the "Idol Version", which was released on February 29, 2016. On that same day, RCA Records announced the release of Piece by Piece Remixed on March 4, 2016, in honor of studio album's anniversary of release in the United States. Containing selections of remixed tracks from Piece by Piece, the remix album is book-ended by the "Idol Version" of the title track and a live recording of "Tightrope" at the Piece by Piece Tour as its opening and closing songs. It also contains two Billboard Dance Club Songs hit singles—"Heartbeat Song:, which peaked at number one; and "Invincible", which peaked at number two.

Commercial performance 
Piece by Piece Remixed made its debut chart appearance at the top of the Billboard Dance/Electronic Albums chart in its issue dated March 26, 2016, marking Clarkson's first entry on the chart. Debuting with 2,000 copies of digital album sales, it also debuted on the Billboard Top Album Sales chart at number 179, which is a component of the Billboard 200 chart. Piece by Piece Remixed was also the first remix album to debut at the top of the Dance/Electronic Albums chart in two years after The White Album by Hillsong United entered at the top in March 2014.

Track listing

Charts

Release history

See also 
 List of Billboard number-one electronic albums of 2016

References

External links
 

2016 remix albums
19 Recordings albums
Albums produced by Greg Kurstin
Kelly Clarkson albums
RCA Records remix albums
Electronic remix albums